Captivation is a 1931 British romantic comedy film directed by John Harvel and starring Conway Tearle, Betty Stockfeld and Violet Vanbrugh.It was shot at the Beaconsfield Studios near London. A second feature, it has been classified as a quota quickie.

Synopsis
The film takes place on the French Riviera where a young woman attempts to attract a famous novelist.

Cast
 Conway Tearle as Hugh Somerton
 Betty Stockfeld as Ann Moore
 Violet Vanbrugh as 	Lady Froster
 Marilyn Mawn as 	Muriel Froster
 A. Bromley Davenport as Colonel Jordan
 Louise Tinsley as Fluffy
Frederick Volpe as Skipper
 George De Warfaz as 	Clerk
 Dorothy Black as 	Adventuress

References

Bibliography
 Chibnall, Steve. Quota Quickies: The Birth of the British 'B' Film. British Film Institute, 2007.
 Low, Rachael. Filmmaking in 1930s Britain. George Allen & Unwin, 1985.
 Wood, Linda. British Films, 1927-1939. British Film Institute, 1986.

External links

1931 films
British comedy films
1931 comedy films
1930s English-language films
Films shot at Beaconsfield Studios
British black-and-white films
1930s British films
Quota quickies
Films set in France